The 1981–82 Washington Huskies men's basketball team represented the University of Washington for the 1981–82 NCAA Division I men's basketball season. Led by eleventh-year head coach Marv Harshman, the Huskies were members of the Pacific-10 Conference and played their home games on campus at Hec Edmundson Pavilion in Seattle, Washington.

The Huskies dropped their last five games of the regular season. There was no conference tournament yet; it debuted five years later.

Washington played in the National Invitation Tournament and defeated BYU in the first round by three points in  In the second round in Seattle, the Huskies lost by four points to Texas A&M.

Roster

Postseason results

|-
!colspan=6 style=| National Invitation Tournament

References

External links
Sports Reference – Washington Huskies: 1981–82 basketball season

Washington Huskies men's basketball seasons
Washington Huskies
Washington
Washington
Washington